Rab Se Sohna Isshq (English Title: Eternal Love) was an Indian soap opera produced by Jay Mehta's Jay Production, which aired on Zee TV from Monday to Friday. Ashish Sharma played the male lead along with Kanan Malhotra. Ekta Kaul made her debut as the female lead. The show revolves around the love triangle involving the characters played by the three actors with a large part of the story occurring in London. This was the first ever cross continental show in Indian Television.

The series aired in Iran under the title به نام الهه عشق from 20 September 2014 to 12 February 2015 on the network Gem Bollywood. The show was dubbed into English as Eternal Love and broadcast on Zee World on DSTv channel 166 and was later also aired on Zee TV UK.

Plot
The series begins with the love triangle of Ranveer, Sahiba and Daljeet. Daljeet is in love with Sahiba, who has feelings for Ranveer. Ranveer flies to London for a job. To meet him, Sahiba needs passport and an easy way is her marriage. She weds Daljeet and reaches London. Upon knowing Sahiba is now married and living in London, Ranveer assumes she has moved on and gets engaged to Jazz. To unite him with Sahiba, Daljeet locates Ranveer who now learns the truth. Sahiba, however, now loves Daljeet.

Enraged after knowing this, Ranveer kills Karamveer and frames Daljeet who is jailed. He asks Sahiba to wed him for Daljeet's freedom. Helplessly she does so, and loses Daljeet's unborn child. Later Ranveer decides to set Sahiba free, unaware that she is now pregnant with his child. Bailed, Daljeet finds the footage of Karamveer's death and then fights with Ranveer, leading an accident in which he dies. His father Karnal blames Daljeet and Sahiba for his death.

6 years later 
Sahiba now works in a private orphanage, after having split from Daljeet who still loves her. She has lost her memory but keeps having dreams. Fateh Rathod, the orphanage owner's son is Ranveer's lookalike. He and Sahiba fall in love. Daljeet tries to separate them. Sahiba finally remembers her past. Fateh accepts her and Ranveer's 6 year-old son, Jeet. They marry. Heartbroken, Daljeet weds Sukhmeet Kaur.

22 years later
Fateh is dead. Sahiba lives with Jeet and her and Fateh's son, Ronak. Rude, Jeet is prejudiced against her. Ronak and Jeet fall in love with Daljeet's daughter Heer, who has feelings from Ronak. However later, Jeet steps aside. In the end, Ronak and Heer marry.

Cast

Main
 Ashish Sharma as Ranveer singh- Husband of Sahiba.Father of Jeet,and Rounak.(death in accident)/2012.
Ashish Sharma as Fateh Singh Rathod- after death of Ranveer Fateh comes in sahiba's life and get married her. Husband of Sahiba.Father of Jeet,and Rounak.(Death in accident)./2012-2013.
Ashish Sharma as Jeet Ranveer Singh- Sahiba and Ranveer eldest son.(after death of Ranveer he becomes Fateh son also).eldest brother of Rounak.(2013). 
 Ekta Kaul as Sahiba Ranveer Singh - eldest sister of Roop.Wife of Ranveer singh and Fateh Singh Rathod.(after death of Ranveer she is in shock and in dileema after that in her life Fateh comes and support her in every matters like as ranveer does after that both loves each other and gets married).Mother of Jeet,and Rounak.(2012-2013).
 Kanan Malhotra as Daljeet Singh-  Husband of Sukhmeet Kaur.Father of Heer.(2012-2013).
 Anuj Thakur as Ronak Singh Rathore- Sahiba and Fateh younger son- younger brother of Jeet.( He borns after Ranveer's death but stills he is son of Ranveer also because he have sanskaar of Ranveer's also). Husband of Heer.(2013).

 Mansi Srivastava as Heer Singh- Sukhmeet and Daljeet daughter.Wife of Rounak.(2013).

Recurring
 Riyanka Chanda as Sabby
 Jass Bhatia as Happy
 Sukirti Kandpal as Jasveer "Jazz" Kaur Sodhi (2012)
 Pramod Moutho as Karamveer Singh Sodhi (2012)
 Neha Janpandit as Mallika
 Aryan Vaid as Harry
 Malini Kapoor as Beauty
 Ekroop Bedi as Roop
 Manmeet Singh as Manmeet Singh
 Sanjay Swaraj as Karnal Singh
 Roshaan Khan as News Caster
 Kanwalpreet Singh
 Juel Stokes as Mrs. Smith

Ratings
The show opened to a TRP of 1.8, and continued gaining TRPs in a range of 1.0 - 1.8 in its initial months. Later, the show started gaining average TRPs of 2.0 - 2.6. The show also recorded its highest TRP of 4.7 when it had a crossover with Sapne Suhane Ladakpan Ke. The show soon dropped in TRPs and was ultimately replaced by Jodha Akbar.

Location
Rab Se Sona Ishq is the first Zee TV show to be filmed in a country other than India. The majority of the show was filmed around London.

References

External links

 Official Website at zeetv.com
 
 Rab Se Sohna Isshq on ZEE5

Zee TV original programming
2012 Indian television series debuts
Television shows shot in London
Television shows set in London